El Limón  is a town and municipality, in Jalisco in central-western Mexico. The municipality covers an area of 130.57 km².

In 2005, the municipality had a total population of 2,646.

References

Municipalities of Jalisco